The spiral ligament is a fibrous cushion located between the stria vascularis and the bony otic capsule.

The periosteum, forming the outer wall of the cochlear duct, is greatly thickened and altered in character.

Additional images

References

External links
 Histology at cuni.cz
 
 Diagram at IUPUI

Ear
Ligaments of the head and neck